United Nations Office in Timor-Leste (UNOTIL) supported the capacity development of critical state institutions, including the East Timor National Police (PNTL) in order to strengthen democratic governance and to help further build to peace in East Timor. A UN Police Force of Technical Advisers continues to provide the country's police, Policia Nacional de Timor-Leste (PNTL), with specialized training for rapid response and intervention units. The Technical Advisers are also responsible for providing training in specialized areas such as counter- terrorism, forensics and transferring management skills to the national police in all districts of Timor-Leste.

Following up on UNMISET, the Security Council passed Resolution 1599 authorising peace-building activities by establishing the United Nations Office in Timor Leste (UNOTIL). UNOTIL commenced on 20 May 2005 and was mandated for one year until 19 May 2006. United Nations Security Council Resolution 1677 extended UNOTIL's mandate one month past expiration while forces from former INTERFET countries came to provide peacekeeping, the main force coming from Australia under Operation Astute. The mandate of UNOTIL was then again extended until 25 August 2006.

External links
 United Nations Mission In Support of East Timor (UNMISET) web page

References

Office in East Timor
Foreign relations of East Timor
Government of East Timor
2005 establishments in East Timor
Government agencies established in 2005
2000s in East Timor
2010s in East Timor